Aiuaba Ecological Station is an ecological station in the state of Ceará, Brazil.
It preserves an area of Caatinga dry forest biome. The conservation unit is threatened from deforestation and hunting by the local people.

Location

Aiuaba Ecological Station ESEC is in the Caatinga biome.
It was created by decree on 6 February 2001 and is administered by the Chico Mendes Institute for Biodiversity Conservation.
The conservation unit is in the municipality of Aiuaba in the state of Ceará.
It is in the mid-north sedimentary basin in the Serra de Ibiapaba.
The area is hilly in some areas, flatter in others.

Vegetation is wooded or forested steppe savannah and has mostly not been altered by human action, apart from some fields.
Many of the plants are adapted to drought.
Bird life is limited due to the long dry periods.

Conservation

Aiuaba Ecological Station is classed as IUCN protected area category Ia (strict nature reserve).
The purpose is to conserve nature and support scientific research.
The eared dove (Zenaida auriculata), which is threatened by professional hunters, seeks refuge in the unit during the breeding season.
The unit is of great ecological importance as the largest Caatinga biome conservation area fully covered in Caatinga trees, and plays an important role in preserving biological diversity.

In 2014 an environmentalist stated that the Aiuaba Ecological Station had been delivered to its fate. 
There had been no manager since December 2012, which was causing irreparable damage to the region's wildlife and savannah biome. 
Hunters were on a spree, killing birds and wild animals, as well as felling centuries-old native trees."
As of 2015 the Gameleira surveillance post had been closed for a year. The unit and its surroundings were threatened by local people who hunt and remove trees, although an environmental awareness program may be having some effect in reducing these activities.

Notes

Sources

2001 establishments in Brazil
Ecological stations of Brazil
Protected areas of Ceará
Protected areas established in 2001
Caatinga